Tara Cross-Battle (born September 16, 1968 in Houston, Texas) is a retired volleyball player from the United States, who won the bronze medal with the USA National Women's Team at the 1992 Summer Olympics in Barcelona, Spain.  She played NCAA women's volleyball for California State University, Long Beach, where she helped lead her team to the 1989 NCAA Championship title. In 1990, she won the Honda-Broderick Award (now the Honda Sports Award) as the nation's best female collegiate volleyball player.

Cross-Battle competed in four Summer Olympics overall, starting in 1992, after having made her debut in 1990.Her height is 190 cm(6ft 3in)

Current life
Cross-Battle is currently working at Houston Juniors Volleyball Club. She previously coached at Texas Pride in the 2011 club season as the head coach of the top 16s team. In the 2010 season she coached at Texas Tornados Volleyball club as the head 16s coach and took her team to nationals and got 13th place at nationals. In 2009, her top 16s team got 9th in the nation.

Clubs
  Pallavolo Ancona (1992–1995)
  Leites Nestlé (1996–1999)
  Paraná Vôlei Clube (1999–2000)
  Flamengo (2000–2001)
  Volley Bergamo (2001–2002)
  Reggio Emilia (2002–2003)

International competitions
 1990 – Goodwill Games
 1990 – World Championship (bronze)
 1991 – NORCECA Championships (silver)
 1991 – World Cup
 1992 – Summer Olympics (bronze)
 1992 – FIVB Super Four (bronze)
 1993 – NORCECA Championships (silver)
 1993 – World Grand Prix
 1993 – FIVB Grand Champions Cup
 1994 – World Grand Prix
 1994 – World Championship
 1995 – Pan American Games (silver)
 1995 – Canada Cup (gold)
 1995 – World Grand Prix (gold)
 1995 – World Cup
 1996 – Summer Olympics (7th place)
 2000 – Summer Olympics (4th place)
 2001 – NORCECA Championships (gold)
 2001 – World Grand Prix (gold)
 2002 – World Championship (silver)
 2002 – World Grand Prix (6th place)
 2003 – World Grand Prix (bronze)
 2003 – World Cup (Bronze)
 2004 – World Grand Prix (bronze)
 2004 – Summer Olympics (5th place)

Awards

Individuals
 2001 NORCECA Championship "Most Valuable Player"

References

External links
 
 
 
 

1968 births
Living people
American women's volleyball players
Volleyball players at the 1992 Summer Olympics
Volleyball players at the 1996 Summer Olympics
Volleyball players at the 2000 Summer Olympics
Volleyball players at the 2004 Summer Olympics
Olympic bronze medalists for the United States in volleyball
Sportspeople from Houston
Long Beach State Beach women's volleyball players
Medalists at the 1992 Summer Olympics
Pan American Games medalists in volleyball
Pan American Games silver medalists for the United States
Volleyball players at the 1995 Pan American Games
Medalists at the 1995 Pan American Games